Aamaret El Baykat    is a village in Akkar Governorate, Lebanon.

The population  is  Sunni Muslim and Alawite.

History
In 1838, Eli Smith noted  the place as 'Amar el-Baikat,  located east of esh-Sheikh Mohammed. The  inhabitants were Sunni Muslim and Greek Orthodox.

References

Bibliography

External links
Aamaret El Baykat, Localiban 

Populated places in Akkar District
Sunni Muslim communities in Lebanon